St. Ann (also known as St. Anne) was a federal electoral district in Quebec, Canada, that was represented in the House of Commons of Canada from 1892 to 1968.

It was created as "St. Anne" riding from parts of Montreal Centre in 1892. It consisted initially of the Centre, West and St. Anne's wards in the city of Montreal. In 1914, the riding's name was changed to "St. Ann", and it was redefined to consist of, in of the city of Montreal, the Centre, West and St. Ann's wards and the part of St. Gabriel ward south of the Grand Trunk Railway tracks; and the parish and town of Verdun (transferred from the county of Jacques-Cartier.

The electoral district was abolished in 1966 when it was redistributed into Lasalle, Saint-Henri and Saint-Jacques ridings.

Members of Parliament

This riding elected the following Members of Parliament:

Election results

St. Anne, 1896–1917

By-election: On election being declared void, 12 October 1906

By-election: On Mr. Doherty being appointed Minister of Justice, 10 October 1911

St. Ann, 1917–1968

See also 

 List of Canadian federal electoral districts
 Past Canadian electoral districts

External links 

Riding history from the Library of Parliament:
St. Ann (1892 - 1914)
St. Ann (1914 - 1947)
St. Ann (1947 - 1952) 
St. Ann (1952 - 1966)

Former federal electoral districts of Quebec